Print on demand (POD) is a printing technology and business process in which book copies (or other documents, packaging or materials) are not printed until the company receives an order, allowing prints of single or small quantities. While other industries established the build to order business model, "print on demand" could only develop after the beginning of digital printing, because it was not economical to print single copies using traditional printing technology such as letterpress and offset printing.

Many traditional small presses have replaced their traditional printing equipment with POD equipment or contract their printing to POD service providers. Many academic publishers, including university presses, use POD services to maintain large backlists (lists of older publications); some use POD for all of their publications. Larger publishers may use POD in special circumstances, such as reprinting older, out-of-print titles, or for test marketing.

Predecessors
Before the introduction of digital printing technology, production of small numbers of publications had many limitations. Large print jobs were not a problem, but small numbers of printed pages were typically during the early 20th century produced using stencils and reproducing on a mimeograph or similar machine. These produced printed pages of inferior quality to a book, cheaply and reasonably fast. By about 1950, electrostatic copiers were available to make paper master plates for offset duplicating machines. From about 1960, copying onto plain paper became possible for photocopy machines to make multiple good-quality copies of a monochrome original.

In 1966, Frederik Pohl discussed in Galaxy Science Fiction "a proposal for high-speed facsimile machines which would produce a book to your order, anywhere in the world". As the magazine's editor, he said that "it, or something like it, is surely the shape of the publishing business some time in the future". As technology advanced, it became possible to store text in digital form paper tape, punched cards readable by digital computer, magnetic mass storage, etc. and to print on a teletypewriter, line printer or other computer printer, but the software and hardware to produce original good-quality printed colour text and graphics and to print small jobs fast and cheaply was unavailable.

Book publishing 
Print on demand with digital technology is a way to print items for a fixed cost per copy, regardless of the size of the order. While the unit price of each physical copy is greater than with offset printing, the average cost is lower for very small print jobs, because setup costs are much greater for offset printing.

POD has other business benefits besides lesser costs (for small jobs):
 Technical set-up is usually quicker than for offset printing.
 Large inventories of a book or print material do not need to be kept in stock, reducing storage, handling costs, and inventory accounting costs.
 There is little or no waste from unsold products.
 Many publishers use POD for other printing needs other than books such as galley proof, catalogs and review copies. 
These advantages reduce the risks associated with publishing books and prints and can result in increased choice for consumers. However, the reduced risks for the publisher can also mean that quality control is less rigorous than usual.

Other publishing 

Digital technology is ideally suited to publish small print jobs of posters (often as a single copy) when they are needed. The introduction of ultraviolet-curable inks and media for large-format inkjet printers has allowed artists, photographers and owners of image collections to take advantage of print on demand.

For example, UK art retailer King and McGaw fulfills many of its art print orders by printing on-demand rather than pre-printing and storing them until they are sold, requiring less space and reducing overheads to the business. This was brought about after a fire destroyed £3 million worth of stock and damage to their warehouse.

Service providers 
The introduction of POD technologies and business models has created a range of new book creation and publishing opportunities. There are three main categories of offerings.

Self-publishing authors 

POD creates a new category of publishing (or printing) company that offers services, usually for a fee, directly to authors who wish to self-publish. These services generally include printing and shipping each individual book ordered, handling royalties, and getting listings in online bookstores. The initial investment required for POD services is less than for offset printing. Other services may also be available, including formatting, proofreading, and editing, but such companies typically do not spend money for marketing, unlike conventional publishers. Such companies are suitable for authors prepared to design and promote their work themselves, with minimal assistance and at minimal cost. POD publishing gives authors editorial independence, speed to market, ability to revise content, and greater financial return per copy than royalties paid by conventional publishers. Self publishing also helps authors share their message with the world without waiting in line for a traditional publisher's approval.

POD enablement 

While amateur/professional writers are targeted as early adopters by some companies, there is an effort presently to make POD more mass-market. A class of companies have chosen to be "author-agnostic", attempting to serve a broad mass-market of ordinary citizens who may want to express, record and print keepsake copies of memories and personal writing (diaries, travelogues, wedding journals, baby books, family reunion reports etc.). Instead of tailoring themselves to the classic book format (at least 100 pages, mostly text, complex rules for copyright and royalties), these companies strive to make POD more mass-market by creating programs by which a range of different text and picture items can be produced as finished books. The management of copyrights and royalties is often less important for this market, as the books themselves have a small clientele (close family and friends, for instance).

The major photo storage services have included the ability to produce picture books and calendars. However, they emphasize digital photography. Some companies apply this method to a greater volume of creative work (primarily text, as typed in personal weblogs) and include the capability to embed photographs and other media Others assume the role of an infrastructure service provider, allowing any partner website to use its pre-designed payment and printing functions.

Publisher use 
Print-on-demand services that offer printing and distributing services to publishing companies (instead of directly to self-publishing authors) are also growing in popularity within the industry. Many major publishers print on demand as a way to save money. It can become costly to print a book regularly that is going to sit on a bookshelf for more than a year before being purchased.

Print on demand allows texts to be revised and published rather more quickly. POD is environmentally friendly because there are only printing and shipping costs for actual sales. POD allows self-publishers to get their books out for little start-up costs.

Maintaining availability 
Among traditional publishers, POD services can be used to make sure that books remain available when one print job has sold out, but another has not yet become available. This maintains the availability of older works, the estimated future sales of which may not be great enough to justify a further conventional print job. This can be useful for publishers with large backlists, such that sales for individual works may be few, but cumulative sales may be significant.

Managing uncertainty 
Print on demand can be used to reduce risk when dealing with "surge" publications that are expected to have large sales but a brief sales life (such as biographies of minor celebrities, or event tie-ins): these publications represent good profitability but also great risk owing to the danger of inadvertently printing many more copies than are necessary, and the associated costs of maintaining excess inventory or pulping. POD allows a publisher to use cheaper conventional printing to produce enough copies to satisfy a pessimistic forecast of the publication sales, and then rely on POD to make up the difference.
 
POD offers advantages over conventional print production and distribution. POD service is not always easy to implement. Print providers and customers have to be willing to evaluate their business process with the flexibility and self-determination to change what is necessary.

Variable formats 
Print on demand also allows books to be printed in a variety of formats. This process, known as accessible publishing, allows books to be printed in a variety of larger type sizes and special formats for those with vision impairment or reading disabilities, as well as personalised typefaces and formats that suit an individual reader's needs. This has been championed by a variety of new companies.

Economics 
Profits from print-on-demand publishing are on a per-sale basis, and royalties vary depending on the method by which the item is sold. Greatest profits are usually generated from sales direct from a print-on-demand service's website or by the author buying copies from the service at a discount, as the publisher, and then selling them personally. Lesser royalties come from traditional bookshops and online retailers, both of which buy at high discount, although some POD companies allow the publisher or author to set their own discount level. Unless the publisher or author has fixed their discount rate, the greater the volume sold, the less the royalty becomes, as the retailer is able to buy at greater discount.

Because the per-unit cost is typically greater with POD than with a print job of thousands of copies, it is common for POD books to be more expensive than similar books made by conventional print jobs, especially if a book is produced exclusively with POD instead of using POD as a supplemental technology between print jobs.

Book stores order books through a wholesaler or distributor, usually at high discount of as much as 70%. Wholesalers obtain their books in two ways: either as a special order such that the book is ordered direct from a publisher when a book store requests a copy, or as stocked, which they keep in their own warehouse as part of their inventory. Stocked books are usually also available through "sale or return", meaning that the book store can return unsold stock for full credit as much as one year after the initial sale.

POD books are rarely if ever available on such terms because for the publishing provider it is considered too much of a risk. However, wholesalers monitor what works they are selling, and if authors promote their work successfully and achieve a reasonable number of orders from book stores or online retailers (who use the same wholesalers as the stores), then there is a reasonable chance of their work becoming available on such terms.

Although returnability lessens the risk for book stores, only a certain proportion of such stock can be returned. Non-returnability can make bookstores less enthusiastic about POD books.

Many print-on-demand publications are debut works; many bookstores are reluctant to risk an author's first, untested work without the endorsement of a commercial publisher.

Another issue is that these books are not available right away and take time to create (Friedlander). When a customer wants to purchase one of these books, they are less likely to follow through with the sale because they do not get the book that day. They are more likely to go home and order through another company like Amazon.

Author's Reversion Rights 
In 1999, the Times Literary Supplement carried an article entitled “A Very Short Run”, in which author Andrew Malcolm argued that under the rights-reversion clauses of older, pre-PoD contracts, copyrights would legally revert to their authors if their books were printed on demand rather than re-lithographed, and he envisaged a test case being successfully fought on this aspect. This claim was contradicted by an article entitled “Eternal Life?” in the Spring 2000 issue of The Author Magazine (the journal of the UK Society of Authors) by Cambridge University Press's Business Development Director Michael Holdsworth, who argued that printing on demand keeps books “permanently in print”, thereby invalidating authors’ reversion rights.

See also 

 Accessible publishing
 Alternative media
 Article processing charge
 Author mill
 Custom media
 Dōjin
 Dynamic publishing
 List of self-publishing companies
 Offset printing
 Predatory open access publishing
 Samizdat
 Self Publish, Be Happy
 :Category:Self-published books
 Self publishing
 Small press
 Vanity press
 Variable data printing
 Web-to-print

Bibliography 

 2007.5 Writer's Market, Robert Lee Brewer & Joanna Masterson. (2006) 
 The Fine Print of Self-publishing: The Contracts & Services of 48 Major Self-publishing Companies, Mark Levine. (2006) 
 Print on Demand Book Publishing, Morris Rosenthal (2004)

References 

Publishing
Digital press
Self-publishing companies